Hugo Miguel Gonçalves Costa (born 20 February 1990) is a Portuguese professional footballer who plays for C.D. Cerveira as a left back.

Career
Born in Póvoa de Varzim, Costa came through the ranks of hometown club Varzim SC. He was an unused substitute for several Liga de Honra games in 2009–10, and played 16 games as they were relegated a year later.

Costa then signed for Primeira Liga club C.D. Feirense in 2011, who immediately loaned him to C.D. Tondela in the third tier. He made his only appearances for the parent club in 2012–13, two games in the Taça da Liga.

In January 2013, Costa signed for S.C. Freamunde of the second division, before then joining Boavista F.C. in the third. On 24 August, he scored on his debut to open a 3–1 win at U.D. Sousense.

Halfway through the 2014–15 season, Costa joined C.D. Mafra, and helped the club win the third division title. Having only played a game in each cup the following season, he joined Lusitano FCV in February 2016. He remained in that tier for the following years, with quick spells at S.C. Salgueiros, F.C. Felgueiras 1932, C.F. Canelas 2010, C.D. Cinfães, Vilaverdense F.C. and C.D. Cerveira.

References

External links
 
 

1990 births
Living people
People from Póvoa de Varzim
Portuguese footballers
Association football defenders
Liga Portugal 2 players
Segunda Divisão players
Varzim S.C. players
C.D. Feirense players
C.D. Tondela players
S.C. Freamunde players
Boavista F.C. players
C.R. Caála players
C.D. Mafra players
Lusitano FCV players
S.C. Salgueiros players
F.C. Felgueiras 1932 players
C.D. Cinfães players
Vilaverdense F.C. players
Portugal under-21 international footballers
Portuguese expatriate footballers
Expatriate footballers in Angola
Portuguese expatriate sportspeople in Angola
Sportspeople from Porto District